Uroplatus fiera is a species of lizard in the family Gekkonidae. It is endemic to Madagascar.

References

Uroplatus
Reptiles described in 2015